The domestication of the Syrian hamster began in the late 1700s when naturalists cataloged the Syrian hamster, also known as Mesocricetus auratus or the golden hamster. In 1930 medical researchers captured Syrian hamster breeding stock for animal testing. Further domestication led this animal to become a popular pet.

The Syrian hamster's natural habitat is in a small region of Northwest Syria near the city of Aleppo. It was first described by science in the 1797 second edition of The Natural History of Aleppo, a book written and edited by two Scottish physicians living in Syria. The Syrian hamster was first recognized as a distinct species in 1839. In 1930, a scientist seeking animal subjects for medical research had the first Syrian hamsters captured to become laboratory animals. Scientists bred those hamsters and during the 1930s sent their descendants to various other laboratories around the world. By the late 1940s in the United States, a commercial hamster industry had begun to provide hamsters for laboratory use and at the same time to popularize hamsters as pets. In later years, further expeditions back to Syria captured other hamsters to increase genetic diversity among the populations of hamsters shared among breeders.

Wild Syrian hamsters become tame in a matter of days after being captured and handled by humans. Wild hamsters are quick to adapt to captivity and thrive in a laboratory setting.

Cataloging as a species

The earliest known publication describing the Syrian hamster was in Patrick Russell's 1797 revision and second edition of his half-brother Alexander Russell's 1756 The Natural History of Aleppo. Alexander Russell was a Scottish physician who had been living in Syria from 1740 till 1750 or 55, and while in Aleppo, he documented the natural history of the region. Patrick Russell moved to Aleppo in 1750 and stayed there till 1781, and like his brother documented natural history. It is uncertain which brother wrote the description of the hamster for the book. Perhaps Patrick took it from Alexander's unpublished notes or perhaps it was Patrick's own addition to the book in the second edition.

In the Russell's book, the Syrian hamster is referenced as "Mus Cricetus Linn. S.N. p 82: Hamster, Buffon (H.N. XIII. p177)", which means that the Russells incorrectly cataloged the Syrian hamster to be the same species as the European hamster as described by the Comte de Buffon and Carl Linnaeus.

In 1839 at a meeting of the London Zoological Society George Robert Waterhouse described the Syrian hamster as a new species. His identification of the animal happened after his 1835 appointment as a curator of the museum of the London Zoological Society, where his job was to process mammal specimens. The body in the museum became the type specimen for the new species. There is no record of who collected the specimen nor is there any record of who donated the body to that museum. In 1853 the British Museum purchased the collections of the London Zoological Society, so now, this original hamster is in the British Museum as specimen BM(NH) 1855.12.24.120. Some derivative works of the Waterhouse publication which also presented the existence of the hamster were Louis Fraser's 1849 Zoologia Typica, Christoph Gottfried Andreas Giebel's 1855 Säugetiere, and Henry Baker Tristram's 1884 Fauna and Flora of Palestine.

In 1902 Alfred Nehring studied a preserved female Syrian hamster specimen at the Beirut Museum. In 1898 he defined and established the genus Mesocricetus and redefined the Syrian hamster as Mesocricetus auratus. Publication in 1940 confirmed that Mesocricetus was a well-characterized genus different from Cricetus.

Capture of live hamsters

After Waterhouse identified the hamster there seems to be no original scientific study of the Syrian hamster until 1930. In 1930, Israel Aharoni captured the first live hamsters known to science and in 1942 published his notes and a narrative of the experience in an autobiography, Memoirs of a Hebrew Zoologist (זכרונות זואולוג עברי [Transliterated: Zichronot Zoolog Ivri]).

Sometime before Aharoni's 1930 hamster expedition, parasitologist Saul Adler was having trouble doing his research because of lack of animal testing subjects. Leishmaniasis was a regional problem and it was common to infect Chinese hamsters as a model organism to study the disease.
 However, he was having problem breeding those hamsters in captivity, and had difficulty also getting regular shipments of Chinese hamsters from China. Because of these problems, he wished to find a Middle Eastern hamster that would be easy to capture locally and have potential in animal testing. Adler may or may not have known of the existence of the Syrian hamster from the Waterhouse publication or others copying information from that work. Whatever he knew, he contacted Israel Aharoni for advice, as both were researchers at Hebrew University of Jerusalem and Aharoni was the head of the zoology department.

Aharoni already knew of the Syrian hamster and when he made his plan to respond to Adler's request, he planned to capture Syrian hamsters and provide them to Adler. Aharoni took assistance from a local Syrian guide, Georgius Khalil Tah'an, who on his behalf got information from a local leader Sheik El-Beled about where hamsters might be found. On 12 April 1930, the sheik called Aharoni and Georgius to a meeting which led to the capture of hamsters and which Aharoni described as follows:

After starting with a mother and 11 babies, Aharoni was left with 10. At the time of capture the babies' eyes were not yet opened due to their age. Aharoni and his wife cared for the hamsters as they carried them back to the university. Somehow before returning the hamsters to the university, all of the hamsters escaped, and when Aharoni recovered them, one had escaped permanently leaving 9 babies. Aharoni delivered these to Heim Ben-Menachen, who was the head of the Hebrew University animal facilities and that department's founder. Ben-Menachen put the hamsters in a wooden box on the floor, and Aharoni recorded this account of what happened next:

The most thorough search was unable to find the escaped hamsters, leaving three females and a male. The male hamster then killed one of the females. Aharoni doubted that the remaining hamsters would breed. Ben-Menachen tried a new breeding technique, described as follows:

Aharoni wrote this conclusion:

Within one year, these three hamster siblings were the origin of a colony of 150 hamsters. Adler was the first recipient of hamsters from this colony. Adler and another scientist published the first research using Syrian hamsters in 1931. Adler was known for his generosity and modesty and often did not make a record of his work, so some of what happened next is uncertain.  Aharoni made no mention of further hamster expeditions in his memoir, but the Museum für Naturkunde has three female hamster specimens in their collection attributed to him and noted as having been caught 27 and 29 April 1930.

Establishment in laboratories

Israel
Among his many scientific projects and recognition, Saul Adler took particular pleasure in distributing Syrian hamsters to researchers in other laboratories. His motivation was the usefulness of the hamster and because he recognized the fragile nature of the single colony.

United Kingdom
In 1931 Adler did wildlife smuggling of hamsters through customs into England by hiding them in his coat pockets. He gave the hamsters to Edward Hindle, then of the London Zoological Society, who himself established a colony for researchers. The hamsters eventually came to the laboratory of Leonard Goodwin whose hamsters became the stock of pet hamsters in the UK.

United States
There is agreement that Syrian hamsters must have come to the United States in 1938. Beyond that, it is unclear how many colonies of hamsters came, why they were sent, or where they went. The available evidence identifies three colonies of hamsters arriving in that year, with two colonies said to have come from Saul Adler, and another colony which could have come from him or otherwise which came from Israel Jacob Kligler, who himself got his hamsters from Adler. In 1939 scientists at Case Western Reserve University published a paper on inoculating Syrian hamsters with leprosy, and in that paper, they said, "Our original colony of 13 animals was secured from stock at the Hebrew University on July 26, 1938 through the kindness of Dr. Adler." There are records that Guy Henry Faget of the United States Public Health Service in Carville, Louisiana received a shipment of Syrian hamsters from Adler in 1938. Faget's laboratory has notes that they received 12 hamsters in July 1938, and another record says that both Adler sent both Faget and Case Western similar shipments of hamsters at the same time. A 1950 publication says that two shipments of hamsters arrived to America in 1938, one to Case Western and the other to Rockefeller Foundation. In 1940 and 41 the Rockefeller Foundation and one of its partner laboratories in Berkeley published several papers based on Syrian hamsters as test subjects, so definitely they had hamsters at that time. In 1948 Adler wrote that before World War II he sent hamsters to India and that Kligler sent animals to America. Since in other notes Adler is known to have sent two colonies to America but not more than that, the available information suggests that the hamsters to Rockefeller came from Kligler and the others were the shipment from Adler.

Hamsters in the United States may have all proliferated from these three colonies.

Popularization as pets

United Kingdom
In 1880 as British Consul to Syria James Henry Skene was retiring back to Edinburgh, he returned from Syria with Syrian hamsters. He died in 1886. The colony of hamsters remained alive until 1910.

When Adler's hamsters passed through the laboratory of Leonard Goodwin, those hamsters became the stock of pet hamsters in the UK. From the UK these hamsters also spread throughout Europe.

United States

Albert Marsh of Mobile, Alabama established the commercial hamster industry in the United States in the 1940s. Marsh first got a hamster when he was gambling and won it in a wager. Somehow he got more hamsters after this one, perhaps from the breeding stock managed by Guy Henry Faget in Carville, Louisiana. At the time, Marsh was a highway engineer but unemployed. After getting his hamsters, he learned to breed them and founded Marsh Enterprises and the Gulf Hamstery, which promoted Syrian hamsters as pets, for laboratory use, and in business schemes. Marsh took advertisements in magazines, comics, and livestock trade journals which praised hamsters as pets and presented the idea that breeding hamsters was a good business investment. In his business, he shipped hamsters to people who would be breeders, then he coordinated the shipment of various breeders' hamsters to other breeders or to laboratories.

Marsh was successful in part because of the professionalism he brought to the art of hamster husbandry. He authored a book, The Hamster Manual, which had a distribution of 80,000 copies by its 6th edition in 1951. In 1946, Marsh began a campaign to legalize the ownership of hamsters in California, which were prohibited. On 10 February 1948, with the help of the governor of Alabama and others, Marsh was successful in convincing the California State Department of Agriculture to designate Syrian hamsters as "normally domesticated animals".

The hamstery business peaked from 1948-1951 then profitability dropped to almost nothing in the early 1950s. The market changed when small hamsteries, most of which started with hamsters from Marsh, became available everywhere and satisfied local demand for pet hamsters. Marsh's Gulf Hamstery closed in the 1950s.

Notes

References

External links

How The Wild Hamster Was Tamed, a 2011 audio story from National Public Radio's All Things Considered
The Untold Story of the Hamster, a.k.a Mr. Saddlebags, a 2011 article from Smithsonian magazine

Golden hamster
History of zoology
Domestication of particular species